SAHB may refer to:

 Sélestat Alsace Handball
 The Sensational Alex Harvey Band 
 SAHB Stories, a 1976 album by the band